Oona Anne Hathaway (born 1972) is an American professor and lawyer. She is the founder and director of the Center for Global Legal Challenges at Yale Law School. She is also a professor of international and area studies at the MacMillan Center for International and Area Studies and a faculty member at the Jackson School of Global Affairs.

Biography 
Hathaway was born and raised in Portland, Oregon. While in high school, she participated in the We the People and Mock Trial programs as a student at Lincoln High School, where she was also student body president.

She received her B.A. with summa cum laude from Harvard University in 1994 and her J.D. from Yale Law School, where in 1997 she was editor-in-chief of the Yale Law Journal.

After graduation, Hathaway clerked for Justice Sandra Day O'Connor of the U.S. Supreme Court during the 1998 Term, and for D.C. Circuit Judge Patricia Wald. Following her clerkships, Hathaway held fellowships at Harvard University's Carr Center for Human Rights Policy and Center for the Ethics and the Professions. She was an associate professor at Boston University School of Law and served as Professor of Law at UC Berkeley School of Law. She is currently the Gerard C. and Bernice Latrobe Smith Professor of International Law, counselor to the dean at Yale Law School, Professor of International Law and Area Studies at the Yale University MacMillan Center, Professor of the Yale University Department of Political Science, Director of the Yale Law School Center for Global Legal Challenges, and an Executive Editor at Just Security.

From 2009 to 2013, 2010 to 2014, 2013 to 2017, and 2016 to 2020, the last period in which a study was done, Hathaway was one of the ten most cited international law scholars. She was both the only woman in the top 10 and also youngest person on both lists. She is also among the top 10 most cited legal scholars in any field born in 1970 or after. She has published widely and been quoted in the media as an expert on treaties and constitutional law. In 2014–15, she served as the special counsel to the general counsel at the U.S. Department of Defense, a position for which she received the Office of the Secretary of Defense Award for Excellence. Her book with Scott J. Shapiro, The Internationalists: How a Radical Plan to Outlaw War Remade the World, was published by Simon & Schuster in September 2017 and was launched at an event organized in Washington, D.C., by  New America and moderated by its vice president, Peter Bergen. The Internationalists received wide acclaim by The New Yorker, The Financial Times, and The Economist, among others.

Personal life 
Hathaway is married to Jacob S. Hacker, professor of political science at Yale University. They have two children.

Bibliography

Articles 

 Hathaway, Oona (2021). "National Security Lawyering in the Post-War Era: Can Law Constrain Power?". UCLA Law Review. 68 – via Social Science Research Network.
 Hathaway, Oona; Strauch, Paul; Walton, Beatrice; Weinberg, Zoe (2019). "What is a War Crime". The Yale Journal of International Law. 44: 54–113 – via digitalcommons.law.yale.edu.
 Hathaway, Oona; Chertoff, Emily; Domínguez, Lara; Manfredi, Zachary; Tzeng, Peter (2017). "Ensuring Responsibility: Common Article 1 and State Responsibility for Non-State Actors" (PDF). Texas Law Review. 95: 540–590 – via Texas Law Review.
 Hathaway, Oona; Brower, Julia; Liss, Ryan; Thomas, Tina; Victor, Jacob (2014). "Consent-Based Humanitarian Intervention: Giving Sovereign Responsibility Back to the Sovereign". Cornell International Law Journal. 46: 499–568 – via digitalcommons.law.yale.edu.
 Hathaway, Oona (August 2007). "Why Do Countries Commit to Human Rights Treaties?". Yale Law & Economics Research Paper No. 356 – via Social Science Research Network.
 Hathaway, Oona (2005). "Between Power and Principle: An Integrated Theory of International Law". University of Chicago Law Review. 71 – via Social Science Research Network.

Books
 
 
 Published in the UK as

Critical response
 
Menand, Louis (September 11, 2017). "What Happens When War Is Outlawed". The New Yorker.
Aldous, Richard (September 25, 2017). "Gentlemen, Let's Not Fight". The Wall Street Journal.
Shermer, Michael (December 1, 2017). "Can We Agree to Outlaw War—Again?". Scientific American.

See also 
List of law clerks of the Supreme Court of the United States (Seat 8)

References

External links
 Center for Global Legal Challenges. Yale Law School.
 
Social Science Research Network page

1972 births
Living people
Boston University faculty
Harvard University alumni
Law clerks of the Supreme Court of the United States
Lincoln High School (Portland, Oregon) alumni
UC Berkeley School of Law faculty
Yale Law School alumni
Yale Law School faculty
International law scholars
American scholars of constitutional law